Birgit Fladager is the former District Attorney of Stanislaus County, California. She was elected in June, 2006 and re-elected in 2010 and 2014. In each of those years, she got more than 50% of the vote in the primary election. She did not achieve this in 2018 and so ran against Deputy District Attorney John R. Mayne in the general election. She won that election and continued to be in office as of 2020.

She retired January 3rd of 2023. She was succeeded by Jeff Laugero, who ran unopposed in 2022.

Early life

Career
Birgit Fladager is the first elected female district attorney of Stanislaus County, California. One of Fladager's earliest national appearances was on an episode of Forensic Files about the murder of a teenage girl by her stepfather Douglas Mouser. Fladager was the deputy district attorney on the Douglas Mouser case and helped convict him.

Fladager made national headlines as one of the attorneys on prosecution team for Scott Peterson, who was convicted in 2004 for murdering his pregnant wife, Laci Peterson. Fladager was later in the news again for not retrying corruption charages against the Modesto mayor Carmen Sabatino (in 2006) and saying she would retry George Souliotes for murder in 2013, before settling the case for involuntary manslaughter.

Fladager was found to have not committed retaliation against former prosecutor Douglas Maner (Fladager's former employee).
During depositions in that case, Fladager admitted reducing a prosecutor's suspension for driving under the influence from 45 days to 10 days and said the public was unlikely to ever find out about the change in discipline. In 2018, there was controversy about an admission that Fladager made when saying that she did not want senior attorneys to tell rookie attorneys that the defendants they were prosecuting were innocent, even when true.

Frank Carson case 
Prominent Modesto attorney Frank Carson and many others were arrested in August 2015 for the murder of Korey Kaufman, believed to be a petty thief who stole from Carson.

Carson ran against Fladager for District Attorney in 2014. A preliminary hearing went 18 months, breaking the record for preliminary hearing length. The record was formerly held by the McMartin Preschool case.

Carson was subsequently acquitted and Fladager stands accused of prosecutorial misconduct related to the matter.

Electoral history

Stanislaus County, California District Attorney

In 2018, Fladager was challenged by Mayne, Patrick Kolasinski, and Stephen O'Connor in the District Attorney race.

See also
List of first women lawyers and judges in California

References

External links
Official District Attorney biography
Official campaign web site

District attorneys in California
Living people
California local politicians
Year of birth missing (living people)